Events in the year 1963 in Bulgaria.

Incumbents 

 General Secretaries of the Bulgarian Communist Party: Todor Zhivkov
 Chairmen of the Council of Ministers: Todor Zhivkov

Events 

 September 15 – The St. Cyril and St. Methodius University of Veliko Tarnovo was established.

Sports 

 The freestyle competition of the 1963 World Wrestling Championships was held in Sofia.

References